Elrigh Louw (born 20 September 1999) is a South African rugby union player for the  in the United Rugby Championship and for the  in the Currie Cup. He can play as a flanker or a lock.

Louw attended and played rugby for Hoërskool Transvalia, which earned him a selection to the  squad for the Under-18 Craven Week. He was also called up to the South Africa Under-20 squad, representing them at the 2019 World Rugby Under 20 Championship in Argentina.

Honours
 Carling Currie Cup Premier Division Player of the Year 2021 
 Currie Cup winner 2020–21, 2021
 United Rugby Championship runner-up 2021-22

References

External links
 

South African rugby union players
Living people
1999 births
Rugby union players from Pretoria
Rugby union locks
Rugby union flankers
Southern Kings players
South Africa Under-20 international rugby union players
Bulls (rugby union) players
Blue Bulls players
South Africa international rugby union players